Luray is a city in Russell County, Kansas, United States.  As of the 2020 census, the population of the city was 166.

History
Luray was established as the community of Lura in the 1870s. In 1887, the spelling of the town's name was changed to Luray. Luray incorporated as a city in 1904.

Geography
Luray is located at  (39.114003, -98.691413) at an elevation of 1,572 feet (479 m).

Located in the Smoky Hills region of the Great Plains, Luray sits on the north side of Wolf Creek, a tributary of the Saline River. Coon Creek, a tributary of Wolf Creek, flows southeast along the eastern edge of the community.

Climate
The climate in this area is characterized by hot, humid summers and generally mild to cool winters.  According to the Köppen Climate Classification system, Luray has a humid subtropical climate, abbreviated "Cfa" on climate maps.

Demographics

2010 census
As of the 2010 census, there were 194 people, 94 households, and 61 families residing in the city. The racial makeup of the city was 97.9% White and 2.1% from two or more races. Hispanics and Latinos of any race were 1.5% of the population.

There were 94 households, of which 17.0% had children under the age of 18 living with them, 58.5% were married couples living together, 1.1% had a male householder with no wife present, 5.3% had a female householder with no husband present, and 35.1% were non-families. 31.9% of all households were made up of individuals, and 17.0% had someone living alone who was 65 years of age or older. The average household size was 2.06, and the average family size was 2.48.

In the city, the population was spread out, with 14.4% under the age of 18, 7.3% from 18 to 24, 17.5% from 25 to 44, 30.9% from 45 to 64, and 29.9% who were 65 years of age or older. The median age was 50.7 years. For every 100 females, there were 100 males. For every 100 females age 18 and over, there were 100 males age 18 and over.

The median income for a household in the city was $36,563, and the median income for a family was $57,500. The per capita income for the city was $29,168. Males had a median income of $39,375 versus $42,813 for females. 1.5% of families and 5.6% of the population were below the poverty line, including 6.3% of those under age 18 and 3.9% of those age 65 or over.

2000 census
As of the census of 2000, there were 203 people, 105 households, and 57 families residing in the city. The racial makeup of the city was 97.54% White, 0.49% Native American, and 1.97% from two or more races. Hispanic or Latino of any race were 0.49% of the population.

There were 105 households, out of which 17.1% had children under the age of 18 living with them, 44.8% were married couples living together, 8.6% had a female householder with no husband present, and 44.8% were non-families. 42.9% of all households were made up of individuals, and 21.0% had someone living alone who was 65 years of age or older. The average household size was 1.93 and the average family size was 2.59.

In the city the population was spread out, with 16.7% under the age of 18, 4.9% from 18 to 24, 21.7% from 25 to 44, 25.6% from 45 to 64, and 31.0% who were 65 years of age or older. The median age was 51 years. For every 100 females, there were 75.0 males. For every 100 females age 18 and over, there were 76.0 males.

Economy
As of 2012, 58.9% of the population over the age of 16 was in the labor force. 0.0% was in the armed forces, and 58.9% was in the civilian labor force with 56.0% being employed and 2.9% unemployed. The composition, by occupation, of the employed civilian labor force was:  37.1% in management, business, science, and arts; 25.9% in natural resources, construction, and maintenance; 14.7% in production, transportation, and material moving; 14.7% in sales and office occupations; and 7.8% in service occupations. The three industries employing the largest percentages of the working civilian labor force were:  educational services, and health care and social assistance (18.1%); professional, scientific, and management, and administrative and waste management services (17.2%); and manufacturing (17.2%).

The cost of living in Luray is relatively low; compared to a U.S. average of 100, the cost of living index for the community is 78.0. As of 2012, the median home value in the city was $33,500, the median selected monthly owner cost was $807 for housing units with a mortgage and $385 for those without, and the median gross rent was $288.

Government
Luray is a city of the third class with a mayor-council form of government. The city council consists of five members, and it meets on the first Wednesday of each month.

Luray lies within Kansas's 1st U.S. Congressional District. For the purposes of representation in the Kansas Legislature, the city is located in the 36th district of the Kansas Senate and the 109th district of the Kansas House of Representatives.

Education
The community is served by Sylvan–Lucas USD 299 public school district, based in Sylvan Grove, Kansas.

Previously, the city was served by Luray High School. The former school building that served as the Luray School and Luray-Lucas Elementary still stands at the corner of 4th Street and Russell County Avenue, in the northwest corner of the town. Lucas and Luray schools united in 1977 forming Lucas-Luray schools. Lucas-Luray was then united with Sylvan Unified schools in 2010 to form Sylvan-Lucas Unified.

The Luray High School mascot was Luray Panthers. Lucas-Luray High School mascot was the Cougars. Sylvan-Lucas is the Mustangs.

The Luray Panthers won the Kansas State High School 8-Man Football championship in 1975.

Infrastructure

Transportation
K-18 runs east-west along the northern edge of the city. U.S. Route 281, a north-south route, approaches Luray from the west concurrently with K-18, then turns north. Bunker Hill-Luray Road, a paved north-south county road, enters the city from the south.

Utilities
The city government provides electricity to local residents. Gorham Telephone provides landline telephone service and offers cable television and internet access. Most residents use natural gas for heating fuel; service is provided by Kansas Gas Service.

Media
Luray is in the Wichita-Hutchinson, Kansas television market.

Culture

Events
The city of Luray holds an annual community festival, Friendship Day, on the sunday of Labor Day weekend. It includes a parade, an art show, golf and horseshoe tournaments, free barbecue, and homemade ice cream. Annually since 1938, a local Methodist church has held another community event, the Luray Methodist Men's Fish Fry, on the third Friday evening of each March. Men from the church prepare and serve fried fish with trimmings and cherry pie, typically attracting hundreds from the surrounding area.

Points of interest
The first log cabin constructed in Russell County, built in 1871 by settler Jonathan Van Scoyoc, has been preserved in Luray City Park on the north side of K-18.

References

Further reading

External links

 Luray - Directory of Public Officials
 Luray city map, KDOT

Cities in Kansas
Cities in Russell County, Kansas